Drive by Shooting is a solo EP by American hardcore punk musician Henry Rollins, credited as Henrietta Collins and The Wifebeating Childhaters. The EP served as a precursor to the Rollins Band.

This recording is a mix of original songs and Rollins's versions of material by others. There is a cover of "Ex Lion Tamer" originally by the UK punk band Wire and a re-vision of a Queen's "We Will Rock You" with different lyrics. The title song is a parody of a cheery 1960s Beach Boys-style song as written by a violent street gang ("We're gonna get in our car / Gonna go go go /
Gonna drive to a neighborhood / Kill someone we don't know.")

The recording is exclusively available now in a double CD package with Hot Animal Machine, Rollins's first full-length solo recording.

Track listing 

"Drive by Shooting" – 2:01
"Ex-Lion Tamer" (Graham Lewis, Colin Newman) – 1:54
"Hey Henrietta" – 3:00
"Can You Speak This?" – 2:00
"I Have Come to Kill You" – 5:21
"Men Are Pigs" – 2:38
"The Road Song" (re-titled "There's a Man Outside (Reprise)" on the 2002 re-release) – 2:36

Original vinyl release 
"Drive by Shooting" – 2:01
"Ex-Lion Tamer" (Lewis, Newman; Wire) – 1:54
"Black and White" (instrumental mix)
"Hey Henrietta" – 3:00
"Can You Speak This?" – 2:00
"I Have Come to Kill You" – 5:21
"Men Are Pigs" – 2:38
"Black and White" is not listed on the sleeve or label

Personnel 
 Henry Rollins – vocals
 Chris Haskett – guitar
 Bernie Wandel – bass guitar
 Mick Green – drums

References 

1987 EPs
Rollins Band albums
Texas Hotel Records EPs